Hellbent may refer to:

 Hellbent (film), a 2004 slasher film 
 Hellbent (novel), by Anthony McGowan
 Hellbent, an album by Randy Rogers Band
 H3llb3nt, an electro-industrial supergroup
 Hell Bent (film), a 1918 silent Western film
 "Hell Bent" (Doctor Who), a 2015 episode of the ninth series of Doctor Who
 Hell Bent (album), a 2013 album by Potty Mouth

See also
 Hellbent Games, videogame developer
 Hell Bent for Leather (disambiguation)
 Hell (disambiguation)
 Bent (disambiguation)